Bastelia is genus of ammonite from the Upper Hauterivian, during Balearites mortilleti zone and possibly also Pseudothurmannia angulicostata zone. Its fossils have been found in Switzerland (B. schloegli) and France (B. taloirensis).

References

Fossils of France
Fossils of Switzerland
Hauterivian life
Early Cretaceous ammonites of Europe
Ammonitida genera
Ancyloceratoidea